The  (French, "Ball Game Square") or  (Dutch; "Foxes' Square") is a square located in the heart of the Marolles/Marollen district of the City of Brussels, Belgium. Since 1873, it has held a famous flea market, known as the Old Market.

The area around the square is characterised by the presence of restaurants and typical Brussels cafés. It can be accessed from Brussels-Chapel railway station, as well as by the metro and premetro (underground tram) station Porte de Hal/Hallepoort on lines 2, 3, 4 and 6.

History
The square was laid out in 1853, at the same time as the neighbouring /. Though the sport is no longer played much today, it enjoyed immense popularity in Brussels in the 19th century.

In 1873, Brussels' municipal council decided to transfer the Old Market, which had until then occupied the Place Anneessens/Anneessensplein, to the Place du Jeu de Balle, a function the square has kept to this day.

Notable buildings
 The Church of Our Lady of the Immaculate Conception is a Catholic parish church, built from 1854 to 1862 in neo-Romanesque style, which was once part of the Capuchin convent.
 The former fire station of the Brussels Fire Department was built between 1859 and 1860 by the architect Joseph Poelaert in eclectic style. Decommissioned in 1982 during the relocation of the fire brigade staff to the / in the Northern Quarter, the former barracks now houses apartments, art galleries, and shops, while its former portico entrance has been refurbished into a café.
 A concrete air raid shelter from World War II is located under the square. Its entrances were walled up in 1945.

Events and folklore
 A flea market takes place on the square every day of the week from 6 a.m. to 2 p.m. and weekends from 6 a.m. to 3 p.m.
 Every year, on 20 July, the eve of Belgian National Day, the National Ball is held there.

Gallery

See also

 History of Brussels
 Belgium in "the long nineteenth century"

References

Notes

Squares in Brussels
City of Brussels
19th century in Brussels